Sentro (Filipino word for "center")  is a Philippine television news broadcasting show broadcast by ABC 5. Originally anchored by John Susi and Ali Sotto it premiered on April 12, 2004, on the network's evening line up replacing Balitang Balita. The show concluded on August 8, 2008. Martin Andanar served as the final anchors. It was replaced by TEN: The Evening News in its timeslot.

History
The newscast premiered on April 12, 2004, replacing Balitang Balita. It was first anchored by John Susi who was held over from its predecessor Balitang Balita and former actress Ali Sotto. Sotto that time was with contract with GMA Network under its radio arm DZBB. On October 2, 2006, the newscast exchanged timeslots with Big News, the evening news program of the network. Susi and Sotto were replaced by Martin Andanar, who became the final anchor of the newscast.

On June 25, 2007, Sentro was reformatted as an all-English newscast answering to Q's News on Q, despite the retention of the name and some of the opening text and ending reminders still in Filipino. This used to be the language of Big News before its main language was changed to Filipino in 2004.

On August 8, 2008, Sentro, together with Big News, aired its final broadcast; it is also the last program to be aired on ABC-5 before it signed off for the last time at around 10:00pm and rebranded the next day as TV5.

Anchors
John Susi (2004–2006)
Ali Sotto (2004–2006)
Martin Andanar (2006–2008)

Substitute anchors
Amelyn Veloso
Jove Francisco

Gallery

See also
 List of Philippine television shows
 List of programs aired by TV5 (Philippine TV network)
 ABC News

TV5 (Philippine TV network) news shows
2004 Philippine television series debuts
2008 Philippine television series endings
Filipino-language television shows
English-language television shows